Tout recommencer (English: Start all over again) is the third studio album of the French-born Portuguese singer David Carreira and the first to mainly target the French language market after two successful albums in Portugal, N.1 (2011) and A força está em nós (2013). It was released on 22 August 2014 and reached number 8 on the official SNEP French Albums Chart, also charting in Belgium's French Wallonia Ultratop Albums Chart.

The album contains some French-language adaptations of hits in his previous albums, like "Boom" and the French/English "Viser le K.O." the latter featuring Snoop Dogg, a remake of the Portuguese/English Carreira hit titled "A força está em nós", the title track from his 2013 album A força está em nós.

Track listing

Charts

References

2014 albums
David Carreira albums
French-language albums
Warner Music France albums